Carroll is an unincorporated community in Smith County, located in the North-East portion of the U.S. state of Texas. It was originally settled in 1890 and had a population of 125 by 1892. The latest data shows 60 residents as of 2000.

Notes

Unincorporated communities in Smith County, Texas
Unincorporated communities in Texas